Bear Lake may refer to one of 29 lakes of that name in Ontario, Canada:

 Bear Lake, Algoma District 
 Bear Lake, Algoma District 
 Bear Lake, Cochrane District 
 Bear Lake, Frontenac County 
 Bear Lake, Frontenac County 
 Bear Lake, Frontenac County 
 Bear Lake, Haliburton County 
 Bear Lake, Hastings County 
 Bear Lake, Kenora District 
 Bear Lake, Kenora District 
 Bear Lake, Kenora District 
 Bear Lake, Lennox and Addington County 
 Bear Lake, Manitoulin District 
 Bear Lake, Muskoka District 
 Bear Lake, Muskoka District 
 Bear Lake, Nipissing District 
 Bear Lake, Nipissing District 
 Bear Lake, Nipissing District 
 Bear Lake, Parry Sound District 
 Bear Lake, Parry Sound District 
 Bear Lake, Parry Sound District 
 Bear Lake, Renfrew County 
 Bear Lake, Renfrew County and Nipissing District
 Bear Lake, Sudbury District 
 Bear Lake, Sudbury District 
 Bear Lake, Sudbury District 
 Bear Lake, Sudbury District 
 Bear Lake, Thunder Bay District 
 Bear Lake, Timiskaming District

Notes

Lakes of Ontario